Foveran Links is a Site of Special Scientific Interest (SSSI) in the parish of Foveran, in  Aberdeenshire, Scotland. It consists of a mobile dune system located along the coast south of the Ythan Estuary, which separates it from the sand dunes of the Forvie National Nature Reserve. The southern parts of the site were partially destroyed by the construction of the Trump International Golf Links resort, which has led to the start of a consultation for the removal of its SSSI status.

References

Bibliography 
 
 Foveran Sands at Nature Scotland

Dunes of Scotland
Sites of Special Scientific Interest in Gordon and Aberdeen